Baddiley Hall is a country house in the settlement of Baddiley in Cheshire, England.  Previously there was a half-timbered house on the site, but this had been replaced by the current house before the death of its owner, Sir Henry Mainwaring, in 1797. It is constructed in brown brick with a tiled roof, and has an L-shaped plan. Its architectural style is Georgian. The house is recorded in the National Heritage List for England as a designated Grade II listed building. Figueirdo and Treuherz comment that it is "a modest Georgian brick manor house, hardly more than a farmhouse".

See also

Listed buildings in Baddiley

References

Houses completed in the 18th century
Country houses in Cheshire
Georgian architecture in Cheshire
Grade II listed buildings in Cheshire
Grade II listed houses